Diana López may refer to:
 Diana López (taekwondo) (born 1984), American Olympic taekwondo competitor
 Diana López (artist) (born 1968), Venezuelan visual artist
 Diana López (footballer) (born 1993), Nicaraguan footballer
 Diana López Moyal, Cuban musician